Fantasy Newsletter was a major fantasy fanzine founded by Paul C. Allen and later issued by Robert A. Collins. Frequent contributors included Fritz Leiber and Gene Wolfe.

Publication history
The first issue appeared in June 1978, and Allen continued publication until October 1981. It was then taken over without a break by Collins, director of the International Conference on the Fantastic in the Arts at Florida Atlantic University. At the beginning of 1984, it was combined with Science Fiction and Fantasy Book Review, and given a new title, Fantasy Review. At this point, it became a semi-prozine, with substantial bookstore sales, and provided the widest coverage of science fiction and fantasy books then in existence. The magazine folded with issue #103, July/August 1987, but the review section continued as Science Fiction and Fantasy Book Review Annual well into the 1990s.

Awards
The magazine won the Balrog Award and the World Fantasy Award.

References
John Clute and Peter Nicholls, The Encyclopedia of Science Fiction, St. Martin's Press, 1993, .

Defunct science fiction magazines published in the United States
Magazines  established in 1978
Magazines disestablished in 1987
Magazines published in Florida
Science fiction fanzines